"Songbie" (Chinese 送别, "Farewell Song"), is a song by Chinese artist Hong Yi (Li Shutong).  Li arranged the lyrics to the melody of the mid-19th century song "Dreaming of Home and Mother" by American composer John P. Ordway.  Li was introduced to this melody while studying in Japan, in the form of a Japanese song that was also set to this tune.

Poem

The original poem was only the first stanza, and so it is in early recordings.  A 1935 recording published by EMI included the second stanza, which may have been added by someone else. 

送别, Farewell Song

長亭外，古道邊，芳草碧連天， 
Chángtíng wài, gǔdào biān, fāngcǎo bì lián tiān.
Outside the long pavilion, along the ancient route, fragrant green grass joins the sky,
晚風拂柳笛聲殘，夕陽山外山。
Wǎnfēng fú liǔ díshēng cán, xìyáng shān wài shān. 
The evening wind caressing willow trees, the sound of the flute piercing the heart, sunset over mountains beyond mountains.
天之涯，地之角，知交半零落， 
Tiān zhī yá, dì zhī jiǎo, zhījiāo bàn língluò.
At the brink of the sky, at the corners of the earth, my familiar friends wander in loneliness and far from home,
一瓢濁酒盡餘歡，今宵别夢寒。 
Yī hú zhuójiǔ jìn yú huān, jīn xiāo bié mèng hán.
One more ladle of wine to conclude the little happiness that remains; tonight my dreams of parting leave me cold.

長亭外，古道邊，芳草碧連天， 
Outside the long pavilion, along the ancient route, fragrant green grass joins the sky,
問君此去幾時来？来時莫徘徊。 
Wèn jūn cǐ qù jǐ shí lái? Lái shí mò páihuái.
I ask of you, as you go this time, when are you to return? When it's time to come please don't hesitate. 
天之涯，地之角，知交半零落， 
At the brink of the sky, at the corners of the earth, familiar friends wander in loneliness and far from home,
人生難得是歡聚，唯有别離多。 
Rénshēng  nán dé shì huānjù, wéi yǒu biélí duō.
In life it is happy reunions that are rare; most often we bid farewell.

天之涯，地之角，知交半零落， 
At the brink of the sky, at the corners of the earth, familiar friends wander in loneliness and far from home,
人生難得是歡聚，唯有别離多。 
In life it is happy reunions that are rare; most often we bid farewell.

History
The song was adapted from a nineteenth century work Dreaming of Home and Mother by John P. Ordway. On March 11, 1916, tenor Evan Williams recorded the English version for Victor Talking Machine Company in Camden, NJ.
When Ordway's work was introduced into Japan, musician Kyuukei Inudou translated it (with a few modifications) into the Japanese version,  (lit. "Loneliness on a Journey"), which was published in 1904. During 1905 and 1910, when Li was studying abroad in Japan, he heard this song by chance, and was moved by its melody. Accordingly, when Li returned to China, he wrote Songbie in 1915 based on Ordway's original work.

English Lyric of "Dreaming of Home and Mother" (Evan Williams version)

Dreaming of home, dear old home. 
Home of childhood and mother- 
Oft when I wake 'tis sweet to find 
I've been dreaming of home and mother. 
Home, dear home, childhood's happy home! 
When I played with sister and with brother 
'Twas the sweetest joy when we did roam 
Over hill and through dale with mother.

Chorus. 
Dreaming of home, dear old home, 
Home of my childhood and mother- 
Oft When I wake 'tis sweet to find 
I've been dreaming of home and mother.

Sleep, balmy sleep, close mine eyes, 
Keep me still thinking of mother- 
Hark! It's her voice I seem to hear- 
Yes, I'm dreaming of home and mother. 
Angels come soothing me to rest, 
I can feel their presence as none other, 
For they sweetly say I shall be blest 
With bright visions of home and mother.-Chorus.

In popular culture
In July 2018, SNH48 Group issued a covered version of "Songbie", which was entitled "砥砺前行". The lyrics were re-written by SNH48 ex-member Wu Yanwen, despite her announcement of departure in January 2018.

References

Chinese-language songs
19th-century songs
Year of song unknown